L'Enfant may refer to:

 L'Enfant (film), a 2005 Belgian film
 L'Enfant (poster), a noted 1987 photographic poster
 Pierre Charles L'Enfant, architect and civil engineer credited with planning the city of Washington, D.C.
 , a 1943 cargo ship
 L'Enfant Plaza, a complex of office buildings, a hotel, and an underground shopping mall in Washington, D.C.
 L'Enfant Plaza Station, a transit station serving the plaza
 "L'Enfant", a song by Vangelis from the 1979 album Opéra sauvage
 "L'Enfant", a poem by Victor Hugo from the 1829 collection Les Orientales